J. Pallassery is an Indian film script writer and actor in Malayalam movies. He did story, screenplay and dialogue for more than 50 Malayalam movies. He has also acted in many movies and tele-serials.

Filmography

Dialogue

 Saanthwanam (1991)
 Mukhachitram (1991)
 Mukhamudra (1992)
 Ponnaramthottathe Raajaavu (1992)
 Snehasaagaram (1992)
 Addeham Enna Iddeham (1993)
 Samooham (1993)
 Naaraayam (1993)
 Kudumba Vishesham (1994)
 Achan Kompathu Amma Varampathu (1995)
 Harbour (1996)
 Kalyaana Saugandhikam (1996)
 Ullaasapoonkaattu (1997)
 Maayapponmaan (1997)
 Aayushmaan Bhava (1998)
 Ilamura Thampuraan (1998)
 Aaghosham (1998)
 Aakaashaganga (1999)
 Vaasanthiyum Lakshmiyum Pinne Njaanum (1999)
 Mazhavillu (1999)
 Daivathinte Makan (2000)
 Karumaadikkuttan (2001)
 Mazhathullikkilukkam (2002)
 Sadaanandante Samayam (2003)
 Mr Brahmachaari (2003)
 Kusruthy (2004)
 Boy Friend (2005)
 The Don (2006)
 Panthayakkozhi (2007)
 Kangaroo (2007)
 Kaancheepurathe Kalyaanam (2009)
 Utharaaswayamvaram (2009)
 Black Butterfly (2013)

Screenplay

 Saanthwanam (1991)
 Mukhachitram (1991)
 Mukhamudra (1992)
 Ponnaramthottathe Raajaavu (1992)
 Snehasaagaram (1992)
 Addeham Enna Iddeham (1993)
 Samooham (1993)
 Naaraayam (1993)
 Kudumba Vishesham (1994)
 Achan Kompathu Amma Varampathu (1995)
 Harbour (1996)
 Kalyaana Saugandhikam (1996)
 Maayapponmaan (1997)
 Aayushmaan Bhava (1998)
 Vaasanthiyum Lakshmiyum Pinne Njaanum (1999)
 Mazhavillu (1999)
 Daivathinte Makan (2000)
 Karumaadikkuttan (2001)
 Mazhathullikkilukkam (2002)
 Sadaanandante Samayam (2003)
 Mr Brahmachaari (2003)
 Kusruthy (2004)
 Boy Friend (2005)
 The Don (2006)
 Panthayakkozhi (2007)
 War and Love (2007)
 Kangaroo (2007)
 Kaancheepurathe Kalyaanam (2009)
 Utharaaswayamvaram (2009)
 Black Butterfly (2013)

Story
 Ananthavruthaantham (1990)
 Saanthwanam (1991)
 Mukhachitram (1991)
 Mukhamudra (1992)
 Snehasaagaram (1992)
 Addeham Enna Iddeham (1993)
 Samooham (1993)
 Harbour (1996)
 Kalyaana Saugandhikam (1996)
 Ullaasapoonkaattu (1997)
 Maayapponmaan (1997)
 Ilamura Thampuraan (1998)
 Aaghosham (1998)Aakaashaganga (1999)
 Aakaashaganga (1999)

Acting
 Ponnaranjanam (1990)
 Mazhavillu (1999)
 Karumadikkuttan (2001)
 Mazhathullikkilukkam (2002)
 Natturajavu (2004)
Classmates (2006)
 Panthayakkozhi (2007)
 Detective (2007)
 Novel (2008)
 Aandavan (2008)
 Utharaswayamvaram (2009)
 Vellaripraavinte Changaathi (2011)
 Venichile Vyapari (2011)
 Kalikkaalam (2012)
 Black Butterfly (2013)
 Natholi Oru Cheriya Meenalla (2013)
 Romans (2013)
 2 Countries (2015)
 Aami (2018)

Television
 Akashadoothu (TV series) (Surya TV) - Actor
Vanambadi (TV series) ( Asianet) - Actor and screenplay
Santhwanam (TV series) (Asianet) -screenplay

References

External links

Malayalam screenwriters
Male actors from Thiruvananthapuram
Male actors in Malayalam cinema
Living people
Year of birth missing (living people)
Indian male film actors
21st-century Indian male actors
Screenwriters from Thiruvananthapuram
20th-century Indian dramatists and playwrights
21st-century Indian dramatists and playwrights